Metcalf Mountain is in the Beartooth Mountains in the U.S. state of Montana. The peak is in the Absaroka-Beartooth Wilderness in Custer National Forest and named for Lee Metcalf, former U.S. Senator from Montana.

References

Metcalf
Beartooth Mountains
Mountains of Carbon County, Montana